Nina Wu is a 2019 Taiwanese psychological drama film directed by Midi Z. It was screened in the Un Certain Regard section at the 2019 Cannes Film Festival.

Cast

 Wu Ke-xi as Nina Wu 
 Vivian Sung as Kiki
 Kimi Hsia as Girl No.3 
 Shih Ming-shuai as Director
 Tan Chih-wei as Producer
 Lee Lee-zen as Mark
 Hsieh Ying-hsuan as Casting director
 Rexen Cheng as Nina's assistant
 Huang Shang-Ho as Director's assistant
 Fabian Loo as Producer's assistant
 Cheng Ping-chun as Nina's father
  as Nina's aunt
 Wang Chuan as Nina's mother
 Sung Shao-ching as Nina's uncle
 Yu An-shun as Uncle Wang
 Marcus Chang as Dong Fu
 Wang Shin-hong as Fisherman
 Vicci Pan as Audition girl's mother
 Chiu Yi-si as Audition girl
 Yoko Young as Girl No.1
 Amanda Chou as Girl No.2
 Huang Hsu-wei as Girl No.4
 Phoebe Lin as Girl No.5

References

External links
 
 

2019 films
2019 drama films
2019 LGBT-related films
2010s psychological drama films
Taiwanese drama films
Films directed by Midi Z
Taiwanese LGBT-related films
2010s Mandarin-language films